Abbas Rezayi is an Iranian politician and former governor of Isfahan Province, serving from 2018 to 2021. He served as Governor of Chaharmahal and Bakhtiari Province from 1989 to 1990, under Prime Minister Mir Hossein Mousavi and President Akbar Rafsanjani. He was Chancellor of Isfahan University of Medical Sciences, from 1997 to 2005 under Khatami's Presidency.

Rezayi is a professor of medical immunology at Isfahan University of Medical Sciences.

Education 
Rezayi holds a Ph.D. in immunology. He is also the Director of the Immunology Department of the School of Medicine, Isfahan University of Medical Sciences.

Early experiences 
 Political Deputy Governor of Zanjan Province 
 Chief Executive Officer of Khansar County (1981)
 Chief Executive Officer of Shahreza County (1983)
 Vice President of the Immunology and Allergy Association of Iran
 Professor of Immunology, School of Medicine, Isfahan University of Medical Sciences
 Director of the Immunology Department, School of Medicine, Isfahan University of Medical Sciences

References 

Living people
Governors of Chaharmahal and Bakhtiari Province
Governors of Isfahan
People from Khansar
Year of birth missing (living people)
Academic staff of Isfahan University of Medical Sciences